The Rashleigh Baronetcy, of Prideaux in the County of Cornwall, is a title in the Baronetage of the United Kingdom. It was created on 30 September 1831 for John Rashleigh. The second Baronet sat as member of parliament for Cornwall East. The 6th baronet resides at Menabilly near Fowey, Cornwall, formerly the seat of his cousins the senior line of the Rashleighs of Cornwall since the 16th century.

Rashleigh baronets, of Prideaux (1831)
Sir John Colman Rashleigh, 1st Baronet (1772–1847)
Sir Colman Rashleigh, 2nd Baronet (1819–1896)
Sir Colman Battie Rashleigh, 3rd Baronet (1846–1907)
Sir Colman Battie Walpole Rashleigh, 4th Baronet (1873–1951)
Sir Harry Evelyn Battie Rashleigh, 5th Baronet (1923–1984)
Sir Richard Harry Rashleigh, 6th Baronet (born 1958)

Sources

References

Baronetcies in the Baronetage of the United Kingdom
Rashleigh family